Ung Hong Sath is the former minister for the interior, cults, and relations with parliament of Cambodia.

He was president of the National Assembly from 1963 to 1966.

References

Living people
Year of birth missing (living people)
Cambodian politicians
Interior ministers of Cambodia